Alevrada is a small village and a community in northern Aetolia-Acarnania, Greece. It belongs to the municipality of Amfilochia. The village has 90 inhabitants (2011 census). Together with the smaller villages Pistiana and Kremasta Sykias, it forms the community Alevrada, population 124 (2011).

Geography

The village Alevrada is situated 3 km west of the artificial lake Kremasta, at 573 m above sea level. Pistiana is about 1 km to the east, on the road to the Tatarna Bridge. Kremasta Sykias is 6 km to the southeast, near the Kremasta Dam. The nearest larger village is Chalkiopoulo, 11 km to the northwest. Amfilochia is 45 km to the west.

History

Alevrada appears as a community immediately after the Greek war of independence and the arrival of King Otto. The origin of the name "Alevrada" is unknown. It may be derived from the Greek  (which means flour) because of the flour mills which were scattered across the banks of the river Achelous. Another interpretation is that a person with the surname "Alevradas" was the first inhabitant of the place. The villagers cultivated corn fields due to the abundance of water from the river, so there was plenty of corn flour which can explain the name "Alevrada" (the village which has a lot of alevri = flour).
During the war for independence there were very few people living in the area, mostly shepherds.  At that time the village was 2 kilometers from its current location. The name "palichoraki = old village" reminds this event. (More information is in the book "Alevrada", edited by Kostas Papaioannou 2007, see below.)

Historical population

References

1.Φύλλο Εφημερίδας Κυβερνήσεως (Φ.Ε.Κ.) 112 τεύχος Α΄(Β.Δ. της 22-5-1919)

2.Εγκυκλοπαίδεια Δομή - Τόμος 3ος σελ. 55 - Εκδόσεις Τεγόπουλου-Μανιατέα - Αθήνα 1996

3. Σταματελάτου Μ & Βάμβα Φ. (Stamatelatou & Vamva) - Γεωγραφικό λεξικό της Ελλάδας (Geographical dictionary of Greece) - Τόμος 1ος(vol. 1) σελ.(p.)90 - Εκδόσεις εφημερίδας το "Βήμα" ("Vima" publications) - Αθήνα (Athens)- 2006

4. Papaioannou Kostas (Παπαϊωάννου Χ.Κώστας)-  Alevrada (Αλευράδα)  - Folklore investigation (Λαογραφική έρευνα) - Athens (Αθήνα) 2007) 

5. See also article about the village (by K.Ch. Papaioannou) in the local newspaper "Aitoloakarnanikos Typos", December 2007, Page 5.

External links
Alevrada on GTP Travel Pages (in English and Greek)

See also

List of settlements in Aetolia-Acarnania

Populated places in Aetolia-Acarnania